Nebojša Radmanović (born 1 October 1949) is a Bosnian Serb politician who served as the 5th Serb member of the Presidency of Bosnia and Herzegovina from 2006 to 2014. He is currently a member of the national House of Representatives.

Radmanović is a member of both the Alliance of Independent Social Democrats and of the Academy of Sciences and Arts of the Republika Srpska as well.

Education
Radmanović finished his schooling in Banja Luka, before going on to study at the University of Belgrade Faculty of Philosophy.

Presidency (2006–2014)
Prior to entering politics, Radmanović was the first director of the Archives of Republika Srpska. He was elected on 1 October 2006 to a four-year term as the Serb Member of the Presidency of Bosnia and Herzegovina and assumed office on 6 November 2006, as did the other two members elected at the same time, Haris Silajdžić and Željko Komšić. He was reelected in the general election on 3 October 2010 to a second term, which ended on 17 November 2014.

Post-Presidency (2014–present)
Four years after having to leave the Presidency, due to the term limit of eight years, Radmanović was elected to the House of Representatives of Bosnia and Herzegovina on 6 December 2018.

Awards
Radmanović was awarded the Medal of Pushkin for the development and expansion of international cultural cooperation between Bosnia and Herzegovina and the Russian Federation.

References

External links

1949 births
Living people
People from Gračanica, Bosnia and Herzegovina
Serbs of Bosnia and Herzegovina
University of Belgrade Faculty of Philosophy alumni
Politicians of Republika Srpska
Alliance of Independent Social Democrats politicians
Members of the Presidency of Bosnia and Herzegovina
Chairmen of the Presidency of Bosnia and Herzegovina
Members of the House of Representatives (Bosnia and Herzegovina)
Chairmen of the House of Representatives (Bosnia and Herzegovina)
Members of the Academy of Sciences and Arts of the Republika Srpska